The German State Party ( or DStP) was a short-lived German political party of the Weimar Republic, formed by the merger of the German Democratic Party (Deutsche Demokratische Partei, DDP) with the People's National Reich Association (the political wing of the Young German Order) in July 1930.

Background
The merger of the social liberalism of the DDP with the nationalist corporatism of the Young German Order did not prove a successful one: the party lost seats drastically in the 1930 election from its showing in 1928, and the People's National Reich Association's Reichstag delegates soon seceded from the party, leaving it essentially the DDP under a new name.

History
The party continued to compete in parliamentary elections, with little success. By the November 1932 election, the party was reduced to two seats. After all requests to merge with other parties were turned down, it ran on a joint list with the Social Democratic Party of Germany in the March 1933 election. However, this saw little change in the party's fortunes; it only won five seats.

The party supported the Enabling Act of 1933 which gave Adolf Hitler of the Nazi Party dictatorial powers. Following the passage of the Enabling Act, the party was the target of severe harassment, as was the case with the other remaining parties.  Pro-DStP civil servants defected to the Nazis out of fear for their jobs. Soon after the government banned the SPD, it stripped the State Party of its Reichstag seats, taking the line that since they ran on the SPD list, they were effectively SPD deputies. What remained of the party dissolved on 28 June.

Election results

See also
Liberalism
Contributions to liberal theory
Liberalism worldwide
List of liberal parties
Liberal democracy
Liberalism in Germany

References

Germany 1930
Defunct political parties in Germany
Political parties established in 1930
Political parties disestablished in 1933
Political parties in the Weimar Republic
Liberal parties in Germany
1930 establishments in Germany
1933 disestablishments in Germany

de:Deutsche Demokratische Partei